The 2014 Kontinental Hockey League All-Star Game took place on January 11, 2014, at the Slovnaft Arena in Bratislava, Slovakia, home of Slovan Bratislava, during the 2013–14 KHL season. Before the game, the players will compete in various events designed to test their speed, technique and creative skills.

The day before the All-Star Game, on 10 January 2013, several legendary veterans of Russian and Czechoslovak hockey played against each other in a friendly game.

Rosters

Fan balloting

Final roster
On November 29, 2013, was the final day of the fans’ vote to select the starting line-ups for the Eastern and Western Conference teams. The best five's selected as the first lines and goalies. In December 10, accredited journalists selected 2nd lines and goalies. On December 12, 2013, the league selected the coaches for teams East and West. The brigade of bosses in charge of Team West were Oleg Znarok, Jukka Jalonen and Fedor Kanareikin. Mike Keenan, Valery Belov and Dmitri Kvartalnov selected to head the Team East.  Following the fans’ vote to select the starting line-ups and the journalists’ ballot to choose the second lines and goalies, the Kontinental Hockey League has added the remaining players to complete the rosters for teams East and West. On December 27, 2013, In response to the wishes of many fans and the sound arguments put forward by professional hockey journalists, the Kontinental Hockey League has agreed to add four attackers to the rosters. Team West's offense will be strengthened by the arrival of Jakub Klepiš of Lev Prague and Geoff Platt of Dinamo Minsk, while Torpedo Nizhny Novgorod’s Denis Parshin and Traktor Chelyabinsk’s Evgeny Kuznetsov have been chosen to reinforce Team East.

Source: Official website.

Withdrawn
Prior to the draft several players withdrew due to injury:

Game summary

See also
2013–14 KHL season
Kontinental Hockey League All-Star Game

References

External links
 

KHL All-Star Game
All
2014
All Star Game
2010s in Bratislava
January 2013 sports events in Europe